The Moma (Muoma) is a river in Yakutia in Russia, a right tributary of the Indigirka.

The extinct cinder cone volcanoes Balagan-Tas and Uraga-Tas are some of the main features of the Moma Natural Park.

Course

The Moma originates from Lake Sisyktyah on the northern slope of the Ulakhan Chistay Range, the highest subrange of the Chersky Range.

There are black coal deposits in the river basin. The district centre – the village of Khonuu – is located at the mouth of the river.

Etymology 

The name comes from the Evenki language, “мома” means "wood, timber, tree". This is the name for the rivers with steep, easy to wash banks that crumble together with trees growing on them, cluttering the river bed.

Hydrology 

Rain, snow and ice feed the river. It freezes in October, the ice breaks up in late May – early June. In the middle and lower courses the river bed abounds rocky rapids, icing is typical. The river is not navigable.

See also 
 Balagan-Tas

References

Rivers of the Sakha Republic